The Journal of Phycology is a bimonthly peer-reviewed scientific journal of phycology (the study of algae), published by John Wiley & Sons, Inc. on behalf of the Phycological Society of America. The journal was established in 1965 and published quarterly until 1992, when it changed to a bimonthly format.

Abstracting and indexing 
The journal is abstracted and indexed in:

According to the Journal Citation Reports, the journal has a 2020 impact factor of 2.923, ranking it 22nd out of 111 journals in the category "Marine & Freshwater Biology" and 76th out of 235 journals in the category "Plant Sciences".

References

External links 
 
 Journal page at society website

1965 establishments in the United States
Bimonthly journals
Botany journals
English-language journals
Publications established in 1965
Wiley (publisher) academic journals
Phycology